The Seventh Amendment to the Constitution of Pakistan (Urdu: آئین پاکستان میں ساتویں ترمیم) was adopted by the elected Parliament of Pakistan on 16 May 1977, a month before the ending of the democratic government of Prime minister Zulfikar Bhutto. The VII Amendment was also the last of seven amendments that were adopted the elected Parliament and enforced by the Government of Prime minister Zulfikar Ali Bhutto. The VII Amendment orders and enables the people elected Prime Minister to obtain a Vote of confidence by the people elected members of Parliament. The VII Amendment also constitutionally orders the people elected President to hold a national referendum for the approval of Prime minister if he or she fails to secure the vote of confidence of the members of Parliament.

Text

References

External links
7th Amendment Text

07
Government of Zulfikar Ali Bhutto